GLOC may refer to:

 ground lines of communication, in military strategy
 g-LOC (g-force induced loss of consciousness), in aerospace physiology

See also 
 Glocs. or Glocs, an obsolete or informal abbreviation for Gloucestershire, a county in England